Anthalma is a monotypic moth genus in the family Geometridae. Its only species, Anthalma latifasciata, is found in Panama. Both the genus and species were first described by Warren in 1901.

References

Larentiinae
Geometridae genera
Monotypic moth genera